Wild In Your Garden was a live BBC television show, broadcast in 2003.

Presenters Bill Oddie, Kate Humble (both in a suburban garden in Bristol, England) and Simon King (mostly on location nearby) presented live action from a number of hidden cameras in or near nest boxes, badger setts and the like. Short, pre-filmed documentary pieces were also included. It was shown twice a day, but at different times, sometimes after midnight.

A sequel, Britain Goes Wild with Bill Oddie, was broadcast in 2004 and the format eventually developed into the Springwatch series.

2003 British television series debuts
2003 British television series endings
BBC television documentaries
Gardening television
English-language television shows
Television shows set in Bristol